Yateri Rural District is a rural district (dehestan) in the Central District or Aradan County, Semnan Province, Iran. At the 2006 census, its population (including the portions split off in 2011 to form Hoseynabad-e Kordehha Rural District) was 5,714, in 1,665 families; excluding those portions, the population was 3,495, in 1,016 families.  The rural district has 12 villages.

References 

Rural Districts of Semnan Province
Aradan County